Dartmoor  is a rural township on the Princes Highway and the Glenelg River between Heywood and the South Australian border, in southwestern Victoria.  At the 2011 census, Dartmoor had a population of 263.

History
Before the township was established the location was known as Woodford Inn.
The township was settled in the late 1850s, a Post Office opening on 1 April 1860. The Mount Gambier-Heywood railway line closed 11 April 1995 and is still pending for standardization due to the Melbourne to Adelaide line conversion.

Traditional ownership
The formally recognised traditional owners for the area in which Dartmoor sits are the Gunditjmara people. The Gunditjmara people are represented by the Gunditj Mirring Traditional Owners Aboriginal Corporation.

Demographics
As of the 2016 census, 322 people resided in Dartmoor. The median age of persons in Dartmoor was 50 years.  Children aged 0–14 years made up 15.0% of the population.  People over the age of 65 years made up 24.3% of the population.  There were slightly more males than females with 50.6% of the population male and 49.4% female.  The average household size is 2.3 people per household.  The average number of children per family for families with children is 2.

76.2% of people in Dartmoor were born in Australia.  Of all persons living in Dartmoor, 0.9% (3 persons) were Aboriginal and/or Torres Strait Islander people.  This is higher than for the state of Victoria (0.8%) and lower than the national average (2.8%).  The most common ancestries in Dartmoor were Australian 34.4%, English 27.0%,  Scottish 10.7%, Irish 6.4% and German 5.9%.

Today
The main industry in the area is the processing of timber from the extensive pine plantations.

Dartmoor has a football team playing in the South West District Football League.

Golfers play at the Dartmoor Golf Club on Wapling Avenue.

Notable residents
 Jeremy Cameron, Australian rules footballer

References

External links

Towns in Victoria (Australia)
Western District (Victoria)